The Pamiris are an Eastern Iranian ethnic group, native to the Badakhshan region of Central Asia, which includes the Gorno-Badakhshan Autonomous Region of Tajikistan; the Badakhshan Province of Afghanistan; Taxkorgan Tajik Autonomous County in Xinjiang, China; and the Upper Hunza Valley in Pakistan.

Ethnic identity

The Pamiris are composed of people who speak the Pamiri languages, the indigenous language in the Gorno-Badakhshan autonomous province. The Pamiris share close linguistic, cultural and religious ties with the people in Badakhshan Province in Afghanistan, the Sarikoli speakers in the Pamir region of Taxkorgan Tajik Autonomous County in Xinjiang Province in China and the Wakhi speakers in Afghanistan and Pakistan. In the Pamiri languages, the Pamiris refer to themselves as Pamiri, a reference to the historic Badakhshan region where they live.

In China, Pamiris are referred to as ethnic Tajiks. In Afghanistan, they are recognized as ethnic Pamiris and the Afghan National Anthem mention Pamiris (Pāmiryān) in the list of ethnic groups of Afghanistan.

In Pakistan, Wakhi Pamiri people live in the Gojal Sub-Division of Hunza District, Broghil Valley of Upper Chitral & Karambar.

The Pamiri people have their own distinctive styles of dress, which can differentiate one community from the next. The styles of hats are especially varied: one can spot someone from the Wakhan, as opposed to from Ruhshon or Shugnon valleys, based solely on headwear.

The Shughni and Wakhi tribes in Tajikistan call themselves "Tajik" unlike other Pamiri tribes in the area like the Rushan.

History

In 1929 Gorno-Badakhshan was attached to the newly formed republic of Tajikistan, and since that point, there has been a great deal of controversy surrounding the ethnic identity of the Pamiris. Some Tajik scholars claim Pamiri languages to be a dialects of Tajik language and there has been a long-running debate as to whether the Pamiris constituted a nationality separate from Tajiks. But there is a consensus amongst linguists that the Pamiri languages are East Iranian, a sub-group of Iranian languages while Tajik language which like Persian is included in Southwestern Iranian, another sub-group of Iranian languages. In the 1926 and 1937 Soviet censuses Rushani, Shugni and Wakhis were counted as separate nationalities. After 1937 these groups were required to register as Tajiks.

During the Soviet period many Pamiris migrated to the Vakhsh River Valley and settled in Qurghonteppa Oblast, in what is today Khatlon Province. In the 1980s debate raged in Tajikistan about the official status of the Pamiri languages in the republic. After the independence of Tajikistan in 1991 Pamiri nationalism stirred and the Pamiri nationalist political party Lali Badakhshan took power in Gorno-Badakhshan. Anti-government protests took place in the province's capital, Khorog, and in 1992 the republic declared itself an independent country. This declaration was later repealed. During the Tajikistan Civil War from 1992–1997 Pamiris in large part backed the United Tajik Opposition, the Pamiris were targeted for massacres, especially those living in the capital Dushanbe and Qurghonteppa Oblast. In the early 1990s there was a movement amongst Pamiris to separate Gorno-Badakhshan from Tajikistan.

Religion
Fatimid-Ismāʿīlī Islam had been introduced to the Badakhshan and Pamir (valley) by Nasir Khusraw al-Qubadiani, who was appointed as the Dā'ī al-Mutlaq and Hujjat al-Islam by Fatimid Caliph Abū Tamīm Ma'add al-Mustanṣir bi-llāh for Pamiris in Xinjiang and Badakhshan in Afghanistan. Today's Pamiris are predominantly Nizārī Ismā'īlī Shia and follow the Aga Khan. The Aga Khan Foundation became the primary non-governmental organization in Gorno-Badakhshan. There are also Sunni Pamiris currently numbering at approximately a few thousand. These Pamiris' ancestors converted to Sunni Islam around the 19th century.

Culture 
The Pamiris mainly engage in agriculture and animal herding. Commonly cultivated crops include wheat, barley, peas, and vegetables. The Pamiris raise sheep, yaks, and goats.

Notable individuals

 Shirinsho Shotemur, politician, one of the founders of the Tajik Soviet Socialist Republic
 Davlat Khudonazarov, filmmaker and presidential candidate in 1991 presidential elections in Tajikistan
 Muboraksho Mirzoshoyev, musician
 Daler Nazarov, musician and actor
 Abusaid Shokhumorov, historian and philosopher
 Qozidavlat Qoimdodov Tajikistani politician who served as an ambassador and deputy prime minister
 Oleg Fesov, musician and composer

Gallery

Notes

References

External links
  1 December 2009

Ethnic groups in Afghanistan
Ethnic groups in Tajikistan
Ethnic groups in Russia
Ethnic groups in Pakistan
Iranian ethnic groups
Pamiri people
Nizari Ismailism
Ethnic groups divided by international borders